Beyram Rural District is a rural district (dehestan) in Beyram District, Larestan County, Fars Province, Iran. At the 2006 census, its population was 656, in 124 families.  The rural district has 4 villages.

References 

Rural Districts of Fars Province
Larestan County